Ropate Ratu (born 1 March 1985 in Lautoka, Fiji) is a Fijian rugby union footballer.  He plays as in both the Wing and Centre positions.
His debut for the Fiji national side was in June 2009 against Samoa.

See also
List of Fiji national rugby union players
Fiji Barbarians

External links
 Player profile scrum.com

1985 births
Living people
Fijian rugby union players
Fiji international rugby union players
Sportspeople from Lautoka
I-Taukei Fijian people
Rugby union centres
Rugby union wings